Calum Stewart (born 1982) is an uilleann piper, low whistle and wooden flute player and composer from Garmouth in Scotland, who performs primarily traditional Scottish, Irish and Breton music.

Career
Brought up in a musical household, Calum Stewart's playing style is rooted in the traditional music of his native northern Scotland. His distinct musical voice has been developed through collaborations within the English, Scottish, Irish, Breton and Scandinavian traditions.

In demand as a concert and recording artist, Calum has recorded and performed with The London Philharmonic Orchestra, The London Symphony Orchestra and Nitin Sawhney.

Calum Stewart regularly performs with Breton guitarist Heikki Bourgault.

Since 2014 he is also a member of the Band of Angelo Kelly (Kelly Family) and performs with him on his tours, Irish Christmas and Irish Summer. He also worked with Angelo Kelly on his studio Albums Irish Christmas (2016) and Irish Heart (2018).

Instruments

Wooden Flute (aka Irish Flute)
Uilleann pipes
Whistle (aka Tin whistle)
Low Whistle

Discography

Calum Stewart albums
Earlywood (2008, Earlywood Music)
Tales from the North (2017)

Calum Stewart & Heikki Bourgault albums

Calum Stewart & Heikki Bourgault (2010, Legba Prod)
Hunter's Moon (2014, Full Spate Music)

Other recording collaborations

Wooden Flute and Fiddle (Calum Stewart and Lauren MacColl) 2012 Make Believe Records 
North by East (Calum Stewart and Gareth Davies-Jones) 2012 Heading West Music

Other recordings
Calum Stewart has also appeared on:

OK Pewter (Mabon), 2007 Easy on the Records
Bridges (Katie Doherty), 2007 Park Records
Live at the Grand Pavilion (Mabon), 2010 Easy on the Records
Mànran (Mànran), 2011 Mànran records
Windblown (Jamie Smith's Mabon), 2012 Easy on the Records
Manannan's Cloak (Barrule), 2015 Easy on the Records
Irish Christmas (Angelo Kelly), 2016 Flowfish records
Irish Heart (Angelo  Kelly), 2018 Electrola

References

External links
Official Website for Calum Stewart
Official Website for Calum Stewart & Heikki Bourgault
Calum Stewart on MusicBrainz

1982 births
Living people
Scottish flautists
Tin whistle players
Uilleann pipers from Scotland
Scottish folk musicians